In Greek mythology, Euneus (Ancient Greek: Εὔνηος) was a son of Jason and Queen Hypsipyle of Lemnos; he had a twin brother whose name is variously given as Nebrophonus, Thoas or Deipylus.

Mythology 
The children were separated from their mother after she was exiled from the island for having spared her own father Thoas. Later, the brothers participated in the funeral games of Opheltes (Archemorus), for whose death Hypsipyle was responsible.

Euneus later became King of Lemnos. According to Homer, the Greek fleet on its way to Troy, in the generation after the Argo quest, was reprovisioned and victualled at Euneus' orders. He ransomed Lycaon, a Trojan prisoner, from Patroclus for a silver urn which had been once offered as a gift to his grandfather Thoas, the king of Lemnos, by the Phoenicians.

The Euneidae, a Lemnian clan of cithara-players, regarded Euneus as their ancestor.

See also 
 7152 Euneus, Jovian asteroid

Notes

References 

 Apollodorus, The Library with an English Translation by Sir James George Frazer, F.B.A., F.R.S. in 2 Volumes, Cambridge, MA, Harvard University Press; London, William Heinemann Ltd. 1921. ISBN 0-674-99135-4. Online version at the Perseus Digital Library. Greek text available from the same website.
Gaius Julius Hyginus, Fabulae from The Myths of Hyginus translated and edited by Mary Grant. University of Kansas Publications in Humanistic Studies. Online version at the Topos Text Project.
 Homer, The Iliad with an English Translation by A.T. Murray, Ph.D. in two volumes. Cambridge, MA., Harvard University Press; London, William Heinemann, Ltd. 1924. . Online version at the Perseus Digital Library.
Homer, Homeri Opera in five volumes. Oxford, Oxford University Press. 1920. . Greek text available at the Perseus Digital Library.
 Publius Ovidius Naso, The Epistles of Ovid. London. J. Nunn, Great-Queen-Street; R. Priestly, 143, High-Holborn; R. Lea, Greek-Street, Soho; and J. Rodwell, New-Bond-Street. 1813. Online version at the Perseus Digital Library.
Publius Papinius Statius, The Thebaid translated by John Henry Mozley. Loeb Classical Library Volumes. Cambridge, MA, Harvard University Press; London, William Heinemann Ltd. 1928. Online version at the Topos Text Project.
Publius Papinius Statius, The Thebaid. Vol I-II. John Henry Mozley. London: William Heinemann; New York: G.P. Putnam's Sons. 1928. Latin text available at the Perseus Digital Library.

Kings in Greek mythology
Characters in the Iliad
Lemnian characters in Greek mythology
Mythology of Argolis
Thraco-Macedonian mythology
Children of Jason